The Maharlika Pilipinas Basketball League awards a championship trophy to the winning team of the tournament.

To determine a champion for a conference, a single-round elimination (sometimes a classification) round is usually held. After the elimination (or classification) round, the playoffs would be held.
 Single-elimination tournament
 Round-robin
 Best-of-three series
 Best-of-five series

Since 2019 season, the Northern Division and Southern Division champions play a best-of-five game series to determine the national champion.

Champions

Tournament Champions

Champions by franchise

Champions by region

Champions by coach

See also
MPBL  Finals MVP

References

Champions